Baihe County is located in the southeastern portion of Shaanxi province, China and is the easternmost county-level division under the jurisdiction of the prefecture-level city of Ankang.  It is by the eastern part of the Daba Mountains and approaches the Han River on the north.  On the east it borders Yun County (Hubei), on the south Zhushan County (Hubei), on the west Xunyang County, and is separated from Yunxi County (Hubei) by the Han River. As of November 2020 the population was 162,774.

Baihe is in the north subtropical to warm temperate transitional climatic zone, and is part of the continental seasonal monsoon climate zone.

Baihe was historically nicknamed "The Head of Qin and the Tail of Wei." It is a largely rural county, populated mainly by Han Chinese.

Baihe's main outside transportation connections are the Xiangyu Railway, National Highway 316 and the Shiyan–Tianshui Expressway.

Administrative divisions
As 2019, Longzihu County is divided to 11 towns.
Towns

Climate

Culture 
Baihe County's local folk customs include wood and stone carving and clam dancing.

References

 
County-level divisions of Shaanxi
Ankang